The Hagedorn temperature, TH, is the temperature in theoretical physics where hadronic matter (i.e. ordinary matter) is no longer stable, and must either "evaporate" or convert into quark matter; as such, it can be thought of as the "boiling point" of hadronic matter. It was discovered by Rolf Hagedorn. The Hagedorn temperature exists because the amount of energy available is high enough that matter particle (quark–antiquark) pairs can be spontaneously pulled from vacuum. Thus, naively considered, a system at Hagedorn temperature can accommodate as much energy as one can put in, because the formed quarks provide new degrees of freedom, and thus the Hagedorn temperature would be an impassable absolute hot. However, if this phase is viewed as quarks instead, it becomes apparent that the matter has transformed into quark matter, which can be further heated.

Matter at Hagedorn temperature or above will spew out fireballs of new particles, which can again produce new fireballs, and the ejected particles can then be detected by particle detectors. This quark matter has been detected in heavy-ion collisions at SPS and LHC in CERN (France and Switzerland) and at RHIC in Brookhaven National Laboratory (USA).

In string theory, a separate Hagedorn temperature can be defined for strings rather than hadrons. This temperature is extremely high (1030 K) and thus of mainly theoretical interest.

History 
The Hagedorn temperature was discovered by German physicist Rolf Hagedorn in the 1960s while working at CERN. His work on the statistical bootstrap model of hadron production showed that because increases in energy in a system will cause new particles to be produced, an increase of collision energy will increase the entropy of the system rather than the temperature, and "the temperature becomes stuck at a limiting value".

Technical explanation 
Hagedorn temperature is the temperature TH above which the partition sum diverges in a system with exponential growth in the density of states.

Because of the divergence, people may come to the incorrect conclusion that it is impossible to have temperatures above the Hagedorn temperature, which would make it the absolute hot temperature, because it would require an infinite amount of energy. In equations:

This line of reasoning was well known to be false even to Hagedorn. The partition function for creation of hydrogen–antihydrogen pairs diverges even more rapidly, because it gets a finite contribution from energy levels that accumulate at the ionization energy. The states that cause the divergence are spatially big, since the electrons are very far from the protons. The divergence indicates that at a low temperature hydrogen–antihydrogen will not be produced, rather proton/antiproton and electron/antielectron. The Hagedorn temperature is only a maximum temperature in the physically unrealistic case of exponentially many species with energy E and finite size.

The concept of exponential growth in the number of states was originally proposed in the context of condensed matter physics. It was incorporated into high-energy physics in the early 1970s by Steven Frautschi and Hagedorn. In hadronic physics, the Hagedorn temperature is the deconfinement temperature.

In string theory 
In string theory, it indicates a phase transition: the transition at which very long strings are copiously produced. It is controlled by the size of the string tension, which is smaller than the Planck scale by some power of the coupling constant. By adjusting the tension to be small compared to the Planck scale, the Hagedorn transition can be much less than the Planck temperature. Such temperatures have not been reached in any experiment and are far beyond the reach of current, or even foreseeable technology.

See also
 Heat
 Thermodynamic temperature
 Non-extensive self-consistent thermodynamical theory

References

Nuclear physics
Statistical mechanics
String theory
Quantum chromodynamics
Quark matter
Threshold temperatures